Vojtěch Němec (born December 9, 1985) is a Czech professional ice hockey player. He played with HC Slavia Praha in the Czech Extraliga during the 2010–11 Czech Extraliga season.

References

External links

1985 births
Czech ice hockey centres
HC Slavia Praha players
Living people
HC Vrchlabí players
Orli Znojmo players
HC Plzeň players
Czech ice hockey left wingers
BK Mladá Boleslav players
SK Horácká Slavia Třebíč players
HC Kometa Brno players
BK Havlíčkův Brod players
HC Vlci Jablonec nad Nisou players
People from Česká Lípa
Sportspeople from the Liberec Region